The Gua Musang railway station is a Malaysian train station stationed at and named after the town of Gua Musang, Kelantan. The old station located at the end of the main street in the old town was closed. The new station is about 1 km south of the old station.

Train services
 Ekspres Rakyat Timuran 26/27 Tumpat–JB Sentral
 Shuttle Timur 51/52/57/60 Tumpat–Gua Musang
 Shuttle Timur 50/53/58/59 Gua Musang–Kuala Lipis

Gua Musang District
KTM East Coast Line stations
Railway stations in Kelantan